Pocoroba is a surname. Notable people with the surname include:

Biff Pocoroba (1953–2020), American baseball player
Mario Alberto Becerra Pocoroba (born 1955), Mexican lawyer and politician